The 1948–49 Swedish Division I season was the fifth season of Swedish Division I. Hammarby IF defeated Gavle GIK in the league final.

Regular season

Northern Group

Southern Group

Final
Gävle GIK – Hammarby IF 4–2, 0–3, (1–3 after OT)

External links
 1948–49 season

Swedish
Swedish Division I seasons
1948–49 in Swedish ice hockey leagues